Archpriest Alexander Sipiagin (August 17, 1875January 16, 1941) was a politician, a priest of the Catholic Church and a member of Russian apostolate.

Biography

Sipiagin was born into a noble family in Tbilisi. His father was in the military and his uncle was the Interior Minister Dmitry Sipyagin. In 1894 he entered the University of Kharkiv, then studied geology at the University of Vienna. Sipiagin after taught at Sevastopol and Kharkiv. In 1906 the Constitutional Democratic Party elected him deputy of the 1906 Russian legislative election. The sudden death of the wife nullifies the previous plans, Sipiagin converted to Catholicism from Russian Orthodoxy and in 1909 became a priest. Influenced his choice acquaintance with Bishop Eduard von der Ropp, who instructed Sipyagin to teach at Roman Catholic seminary in Saratov. At the beginning of the Russian Civil War, he was sent to Constantinople, where he establishes contact with the International Red Cross and deals with the fate of Russian prisoners. Then Sipyagin worked at Saint George Boarding for Russian children. In 1924 received the title of Monsignor. From 1929 he worked at the Commission on the establishment of the Code of Canon Law of the Eastern Churches, taught in " Russicum "in publishing and research activities in the monastery of Grottaferrata. Sipyagin published his articles in the Catholic periodical: " Faith and Life "," Faith and the Church, "" To the compound: Russian Catholic magazine , "" Faith and Fatherland "," Ringing of church bells and the magazine " Kitezh (magazine). " Sipiagin was not only a talented journalist, but as a researcher and systematizer of Catholic publications in Russian. In 1935 in Harbin went up by it "Catalogue of Catholic literature in Russian." Sipiagin donated to the Russicumlibrary about 200 books.

From 1930 he taught at the missionary Institute at the John Paul II Catholic University of Lublin, Poland. In October 1933 Sipyagin participated in Rome in a meeting of Russian Catholic clergy.

Death

Alexander Sipyagin died in Rome and was buried at the Campo Verano cemetery.

References

Father Alexander Sipyagin / / To compound: Russian Catholic magazine . Vilna, 1934, № 9-10. with. 18-19.

Archpriest Alexander Sipyagin / / To compound: Russian Catholic magazine . Vilna, 1934, № 11-12. with. 9.12

Yes zluchennya: Belaruskaya religiynaya chasopis. Albertyn: Vydavetstva Isusavaga Fellowship, 1933, № 5.

External links

A bibliography Sipyagina found in http://catholichurch.ru/index.php/files/file/283--протоиерей-александр-сипягин/: Vladimir Kolupaev . Fate of the Russian Catholic priest of the Diocese of Tiraspol: Archpriest Alexander Sipagin
 http://zarubezhje.narod.ru/rs/s_134.htm
 http://procatholic.ru/index.php?option=com_content&view=article&id=1608:2009-05-19-08-23-01&catid=69:2008-02-26-13-17-45&Itemid=59
 http://zarubezhje.narod.ru/texts/frrostislav3.htm

1875 births
1941 deaths
Journalists from Tbilisi
Clergy from Tbilisi
People from Tiflis Governorate
Russian Roman Catholic priests
Former Russian Orthodox Christians
Converts to Roman Catholicism from Eastern Orthodoxy
Russian Constitutional Democratic Party members
Members of the 1st State Duma of the Russian Empire
National University of Kharkiv alumni